Eissporthalle Kassel is an arena located in Kassel, Germany in the southeast end of Karlsaue. It opened in 1977 and holds 6,100 spectators. It is primarily used for ice hockey and was the home arena of Kassel Huskies of the Deutsche Eishockey Liga.

External links
Venue information

Indoor arenas in Germany
Indoor ice hockey venues in Germany
Buildings and structures in Kassel
Sports venues in Hesse
Sport in Kassel